Srinivasa Ramanujan Institute of Basic Sciences is an institute set up Government of Kerala, India, in Trivandrum as an R&D institution under Kerala State Council for Science, Technology and Environment (KSCSTE) for the promotion research in basic sciences. The decision to create the  institution was taken by Government of Kerala as part of the 125th birth anniversary celebrations of the legendary  Indian mathematical genius Srinivasa Ramanujan and the formation of the institute was announced by Oommen Chandy, Chief Minister of Kerala, on 13 January 2012. The institute was formally inaugurated on 7 February 2013.  It is currently  functioning in the campus of Rajiv Gandhi Institute of Technology, Kottayam, Kerala. An Advisory Board chaired by E.C.G. Sudarshan helps the institute in shaping its academic activities. Since its inception, the institute has been organising various academic programmes like colloquia and workshops on a regular basis.

References

Srinivasa Ramanujan
Education in Kottayam
Research institutes in Kerala
Research institutes established in 2013
2013 establishments in Kerala